The 1971–72 Vancouver Canucks season was the Canucks' second season in the NHL. They finished 7th, last, in the East Division. Hal Laycoe, the team's first head coach, was fired after the season concluded and replaced by Vic Stasiuk.

Regular season
The Canucks opened the season at home against the Toronto Maple Leafs on October 8, 1971. They lost the game 3–2, though Jocelyn Guevremont, the team's first draft choice in the 1971 NHL Amateur Draft, scored his first goal. In their game against the Minnesota North Stars on October 20, the Canucks were shutout for the first time, losing 7–0. One week later the Canucks played the Maple Leafs and drew them 0–0, the first time the team had a shutout of their own; Dunc Wilson was in net for the Canucks, while Bernie Parent was in for the Maple Leafs.

During his tour of Canada, Soviet Premier Alexei Kosygin and his entourage watched the Canucks play the Montreal Canadiens on October 22. They stayed for the first two periods and saw Montreal score four goals en route to winning the game 6–0. Frank Mahovlich recorded a hat trick for the Canadiens, while Ken Dryden earned the shutout.

With the season concluded, Hal Laycoe was fired as head coach of the team. He was appointed vice-president of player development and scouting, and Vic Stasiuk was named the new coach.

Standings

Divisional standings

Schedule and results

|-  style="text-align:center; background:#fbb;"
| 1 || October 8 || Toronto || 3–2 || Vancouver || 0–1–0 || 0
|-  style="text-align:center; background:#fbb;"
| 2 || October 10 || Los Angeles || 4–2 || Vancouver || 0–2–0 || 0
|-  style="text-align:center; background:#bfb;"
| 3 || October 12 || Philadelphia || 2–3 || Vancouver || 1–2–0 || 2
|-  style="text-align:center; background:#bfb;"
| 4 || October 15 || Vancouver || 9–6 || California || 2–2–0 || 4
|-  style="text-align:center; background:#fbb;"
| 5 || October 16 || Pittsburgh || 2–1 || Vancouver || 2–3–0 || 4
|-  style="text-align:center; background:#bfb;"
| 6 || October 19 || Vancouver || 3–1 || St. Louis || 3–3–0 || 6
|-  style="text-align:center; background:#fbb;"
| 7 || October 20 || Vancouver || 0–7 || Minnesota || 3–4–0 || 6
|-  style="text-align:center; background:#fbb;"
| 8 || October 22 || Montreal || 6–0 || Vancouver || 3–5–0 || 6
|-  style="text-align:center; background:#fbb;"
| 9 || October 24 || Boston || 4–3 || Vancouver || 3–6–0 || 6
|-  style="text-align:center; background:#ffb;"
| 10 || October 27 || Vancouver || 0–0 || Toronto || 3–6–1 || 7
|-  style="text-align:center; background:#fbb;"
| 11 || October 28 || Vancouver || 2–3 || Philadelphia || 3–7–1 || 7
|-  style="text-align:center; background:#ffb;"
| 12 || October 30 || Buffalo || 4–4 || Vancouver || 3–7–2 || 8
|-  style="text-align:center; background:#bfb;"
| 13 || October 31 || Chicago || 2–6 || Vancouver || 4–7–2 || 10
|-

|-  style="text-align:center; background:#bfb;"
| 14 || November 5 || Pittsburgh || 2–4 || Vancouver || 5–7–2 || 12
|-  style="text-align:center; background:#fbb;"
| 15 || November 6 || New York || 3–1 || Vancouver || 5–8–2 || 12
|-  style="text-align:center; background:#fbb;"
| 16 || November 10 || Vancouver || 1–3 || Pittsburgh || 5–9–2 || 12
|-  style="text-align:center; background:#fbb;"
| 17 || November 11 || Vancouver || 3–4 || Philadelphia || 5–10–2 || 12
|-  style="text-align:center; background:#ffb;"
| 18 || November 13 || Vancouver || 2–2 || Toronto || 5–10–3 || 13
|-  style="text-align:center; background:#fbb;"
| 19 || November 14 || Vancouver || 1–6 || New York || 5–11–3 || 13
|-  style="text-align:center; background:#fbb;"
| 20 || November 17 || Vancouver || 0–3 || Chicago || 5–12–3 || 13
|-  style="text-align:center; background:#fbb;"
| 21 || November 18 || Vancouver || 0–5 || Boston || 5–13–3 || 13
|-  style="text-align:center; background:#ffb;"
| 22 || November 21 || Detroit || 2–2 || Vancouver || 5–13–4 || 14
|-  style="text-align:center; background:#fbb;"
| 23 || November 23 || Minnesota || 2–1 || Vancouver || 5–14–4 || 14
|-  style="text-align:center; background:#bfb;"
| 24 || November 27 || Buffalo || 2–5 || Vancouver || 6–14–4 || 16
|-  style="text-align:center; background:#bfb;"
| 25 || November 30 || Chicago || 2–4 || Vancouver || 7–14–4 || 18
|-

|-  style="text-align:center; background:#fbb;"
| 26 || December 4 || Vancouver || 0–7 || Montreal || 7–15–4 || 18
|-  style="text-align:center; background:#fbb;"
| 27 || December 5 || Vancouver || 3–6 || New York || 7–16–4 || 18
|-  style="text-align:center; background:#bfb;"
| 28 || December 7 || St. Louis || 1–2 || Vancouver || 8–16–4 || 20
|-  style="text-align:center; background:#fbb;"
| 29 || December 11 || Boston || 6–2 || Vancouver || 8–17–4 || 20
|-  style="text-align:center; background:#fbb;"
| 30 || December 14 || Detroit || 4–3 || Vancouver || 8–18–4 || 20
|-  style="text-align:center; background:#fbb;"
| 31 || December 17 || Monreal || 6–2 || Vancouver || 8–19–4 || 20
|-  style="text-align:center; background:#fbb;"
| 32 || December 19 || Vancouver || 1–5 || Buffalo || 8–20–4 || 20
|-  style="text-align:center; background:#fbb;"
| 33 || December 22 || Vancouver || 0–3 || Detroit || 8–21–4 || 20
|-  style="text-align:center; background:#bfb;"
| 34 || December 26 || California || 2–6 || Vancouver || 9–21–4 || 22
|-  style="text-align:center; background:#fbb;"
| 35 || December 29 || Vancouver || 1–3 || Los Angeles || 9–22–4 || 22
|-

|-  style="text-align:center; background:#fbb;"
| 36 || January 2 || Los Angeles || 6–3 || Vancouver || 9–23–4 || 22
|-  style="text-align:center; background:#fbb;"
| 37 || January 5 || Vancouver || 4–6 || Montreal || 9–24–4 || 22
|-  style="text-align:center; background:#bfb;"
| 38 || January 8  || Vancouver || 5–1 || Minnesota || 10–24–4 || 24
|-  style="text-align:center; background:#ffb;"
| 39 || January 11 || Minnesota || 2–2 || Vancouver || 10–24–5 || 25
|-  style="text-align:center; background:#fbb;"
| 40 || January 14 || Vancouver || 3–5 || California || 10–25–5 || 25
|-  style="text-align:center; background:#bfb;"
| 41 || January 15 || California || 3–4 || Vancouver || 11–25–5 || 27
|-  style="text-align:center; background:#bfb;"
| 42 || January 19 || Vancouver || 6–1 || Pittsburgh || 12–25–5 || 29
|-  style="text-align:center; background:#fbb;"
| 43 || January 20 || Vancouver || 0–1 || Buffalo || 12–26–5 || 29
|-  style="text-align:center; background:#bfb;"
| 44 || January 22 || New York || 2–5 || Vancouver || 13–26–5|| 31 
|-  style="text-align:center; background:#fbb;"
| 45 || January 27 || Vancouver || 0–4 || Chicago || 13–27–5 || 31
|-  style="text-align:center; background:#bfb;"
| 46 || January 29 || Toronto || 2–5 || Vancouver || 14–27–5 || 33
|-  style="text-align:center; background:#fbb;"
| 47 || January 30 || California || 2–0 || Vancouver || 14–28–5 || 33
|-

|-  style="text-align:center; background:#bfb;"
| 48 || February 2 || Vancouver || 5–1 || California || 15–28–5 || 35
|-  style="text-align:center; background:#fbb;"
| 49 || February 4 || Chicago || 6–2 || Vancouver || 15–29–5 || 35
|-  style="text-align:center; background:#fbb;"
| 50 || February 6 || Montreal || 4–2 || Vancouver || 15–30–5 || 35
|-  style="text-align:center; background:#fbb;"
| 51 || February 8 || Philadelphia || 3–1 || Vancouver || 15–31–5 || 35
|-  style="text-align:center; background:#fbb;"
| 52 || February 10 || Vancouver || 1–9 || Boston || 15–32–5 || 35
|-  style="text-align:center; background:#fbb;"
| 53 || February 12 || Vancouver || 4–5 || St. Louis || 15–33–5 || 35
|-  style="text-align:center; background:#fbb;"
| 54 || February 13 || Vancouver || 4–6 || Pittsburgh || 15–34–5 || 35
|-  style="text-align:center; background:#fbb;"
| 55 || February 15 || New York || 5–1 || Vancouver || 15–35–5 || 35
|-  style="text-align:center; background:#bfb;"
| 56 || February 18 || St. Louis || 2–5 || Vancouver || 16–35–5 || 37
|-  style="text-align:center; background:#fbb;"
| 57 || February 19 || Vancouver || 3–5 || Los Angeles || 16–36–5 || 37
|-  style="text-align:center; background:#fbb;"
| 58 || February 22 || Boston || 4–3 || Vancouver || 16–37–5 || 37
|-  style="text-align:center; background:#fbb;"
| 59 || February 24 || Vancouver || 0–2 || Detroit || 16–38–5 || 37
|-  style="text-align:center; background:#fbb;"
| 60 || February 26 || Vancouver || 1–7 || Toronto || 16–39–5 || 37
|-  style="text-align:center; background:#ffb;"
| 61 || February 27 || Vancouver || 3–3 || Chicago || 16–39–6 || 38
|-  style="text-align:center; background:#fbb;"
| 62 || February 29 || Vancouver || 2–8 || Detroit || 16–40–6 || 38
|-

|-  style="text-align:center; background:#fbb;"
| 63 || March 2 || Vancouver || 3–7 || Boston || 16–41–6 || 38
|-  style="text-align:center; background:#fbb;"
| 64 || March 4 || Vancouver || 0–5 || Montreal || 16–42–6 || 38
|-  style="text-align:center; background:#fbb;"
| 65 || March 5 || Vancouver || 1–6 || New York || 16–43–6 || 38
|-  style="text-align:center; background:#fbb;"
| 66 || March 8 || Philadelphia || 6–5 || Vancouver || 16–44–6 || 38
|-  style="text-align:center; background:#bfb;"
| 67 || March 10 || Buffalo || 2–3 || Vancouver || 17–44–6 || 40
|-  style="text-align:center; background:#fbb;"
| 68 || March 14 || Pittsburgh || 7–4 || Vancouver || 17–45–6 || 40
|-  style="text-align:center; background:#fbb;"
| 69 || March 16 || Vancouver || 2–6 || Minnesota || 17–46–6 || 40
|-  style="text-align:center; background:#bfb;"
| 70 || March 17 || Vancouver || 6–2 || Buffalo || 18–46–6 || 42
|-  style="text-align:center; background:#ffb;"
| 71 || March 19 || St. Louis || 3–3 || Vancouver || 18–46–7 || 43
|-  style="text-align:center; background:#fbb;"
| 72 || March 21 || Detroit || 7–5 || Vancouver || 18–47–7 || 43
|-  style="text-align:center; background:#bfb;"
| 73 || March 24 || Toronto || 3–5 || Vancouver || 19–47–7 || 45
|-  style="text-align:center; background:#fbb;"
| 74 || March 26 || Vancouver || 1–4 || Philadelphia || 19–48–7 || 45
|-  style="text-align:center; background:#fbb;"
| 75 || March 28 || Vancouver || 1–2 || St. Louis || 19–49–7 || 45
|-  style="text-align:center; background:#fbb;"
| 76 || March 29 || Vancouver || 2–4 || Los Angeles || 19–50–7 || 45
|-  style="text-align:center; background:#ffb;"
| 77 || March 31 || Los Angeles || 4–4 || Vancouver || 19–50–8 || 46
|-

|-  style="text-align:center; background:#bfb;"
| 78 || April 2 || Minnesota || 1–4 || Vancouver || 20–50–8 || 48
|-

Player statistics

Skaters
Note: GP = Games played; G = Goals; A = Assists; Pts = Points; PIM = Penalty minutes

†Denotes player spent time with another team before joining Vancouver.  Stats reflect time with the Canucks only.

Denotes player traded by Vancouver midway through the season. Stats reflect time with Canucks only.

Goaltenders
Note: GP = Games played; Min = Minutes; W = Wins; L = Losses; T = Ties; GA = Goals against; SO = Shutouts; GAA = Goals against average

Awards and records

Trophies and awards
Cyclone Taylor Award (Canucks MVP): Orland Kurtenbach
Cyrus H. McLean Trophy (Canucks Leading Scorer): Andre Boudrias, Orland Kurtenbach
Fred J. Hume Award (Canucks Unsung Hero): Ron Ward
Most Exciting Player: Andre Boudrias

Records achieved in the season

Canucks team records
Fewest points overall: (48) – repeated in 1994–95
Fewest road points: (15) – repeated in 1972–73
Fewest wins overall: (20) – (18 in shortened 1994–95 season)
Most losses overall: (50)
Most road losses: (30)
Fewest ties overall: (8) – repeated in 1970–71, 1986–87, 1988–89
Most shutouts against: (12)

Transactions
The Canucks were involved in the following transactions during the 1971–72 season.

Trades

Draft picks
Vancouver's picks at the 1971 NHL Amateur Draft, held at the Queen Elizabeth Hotel in Montreal.

Notes

References

Player stats: 2006–07 Vancouver Canucks Media Guide – 1970–71 stats, pg. 150.
Game log: 2006–07 Vancouver Canucks Media Guide – 1970–71 stats, pg. 150.
Team standings: 2007–08 NHL Official Guide & Record Book, pg. 150.
Team records: 2006–07 Vancouver Canucks Media Guide – Canucks all time team & individual records, pp. 225–237

See also
1971–72 NHL season

Vancouver Canucks seasons
Vanc
Vanc